.38 rimfire cartridges are a type of ammunition that have been in service in the United States since the mid-nineteenth century.  The cartridges are produced in short, long and extra long variants.

Much like the smaller .32 rimfire, the rounds were originally manufactured loaded with black powder.  In the early 1900s, manufacturers switched to the "new" smokeless powder.

The .38 rimfire was preferred to the .32 rimfire for hunting and self-defense purposes because of its larger size and increased power.

History
The .38 rimfire cartridge was a common round for many antique revolvers and rifles from the 1870s to the early 1900s. It was a common self-defense round for a small revolver that was often kept in a vest pocket through to the 1890s.  Production in the United States of rimfire calibers larger than .22 ceased upon the country's entry into World War II and was never resumed again by any of the major manufacturers.  Factory loaded ammunition is no longer available except as collector items.

Uses and variants
The .38 rimfire cartridge was available in short, long, extra long, and also shotshells. Most of the revolvers and rifle which were produced were chambered for either .38 short rifle , or .38 long rifle. While there were a few different rifles produced for the .38 extra long cartridge and a few rolling block, falling block, and bolt-action rifles had smoothbore barrels which had a slight choke which enabled it to shoot the .38 RF shotshells, which was good for hunting small game at close ranges. Hopkins & Allen produced revolvers and rifles chambered for the .38RF.  Rifles of this caliber were produced by Remington (the revolving rifle of 1866), Ballard, Stevens and Frank Wesson, and revolvers by Enterprise, Favorite, Forehand & Wadsworth, and Colt.

See also
 Hopkins & Allen
 Revolvers
 Rifles
 Rimfire ammunition
 American Civil War

References

 http://www.oldammo.com/august04.htm

Pistol and rifle cartridges
Rimfire cartridges